Joujouka Black Eyes is a CD by Moroccan Sufi trance musicians Master Musicians of Joujouka. It was released in May 1995 on Sub Rosa Records. It was produced by Frank Rynne and includes the song "Brian Jones Joujouka very Stoned" written by Joujouka born painter Mohamed Hamri. This song commemorates the third visit of Rolling Stones founder Brian Jones to Jajouka. On this visit Jones recorded Brian Jones Presents the Pipes of Pan at Joujouka. The group on this CD includes veteran Joujouka musician Mujehid Mujdoubi (1893-1997).

Musician credits
 Ahmed El Attar drum and vocal
 Mohamed El Attar lira and rhiata and vocals
 Mustapha El Attar drum
 Ahmed Bouhsini rhiata lira
 Abdelslam Boukhzar drum vocal
 Abdelslam Errtoubi rhiata and lira
 Mujehid Mujdoubi lira
 Muinier Mujdoubi drum
 Muckthar Jagdhal drum and vocal
 Mohamed Mokhchan rhiata and lira
 Abdelslam Dahnoun drum, rhiata, lira
 El Hadj clapping and vocal
 Si Ahmed violin

Catalogue number
SR87

References

External links
 Master Musicians of Joujouka Website and Ethical Store
  An interview with Frank Rynne talking about more than 15 years working with, managing and recording The Master Musicians of Joujouka. The Lazarus Corporation (UK, Nov. 2007).

Master Musicians of Joujouka albums
1995 live albums